Camillo Ferdinando Facchinetti, known as Roby Facchinetti (born 1 May 1944) is an Italian musician, singer and keyboardist of the band Pooh. He was born in Bergamo, Lombardy.

He was the main Pooh songwriter, sharing this role with guitarist Dodi Battaglia starting from 1972 LP Alessandra. Facchinetti was a member of the band until their split up in 2016. He also published several solo albums.

He participated at the Sanremo Music Festival 2007 together with his son Francesco Facchinetti, and again at the 2018 edition with Riccardo Fogli.

Discography 
Solo
 Roby Facchinetti (1984)
 Fai col cuore (1993)
 Ma che vita la mia (2014)
 Insieme (2017)
 Inseguendo la mia musica (2020)

Pooh

References 

1944 births
Living people
Musicians from Bergamo
Italian keyboardists
Italian pop singers